Avshalom was an Israeli settlement in the Sinai Peninsula.

History
The settlement was founded in 1972. It was initially named Merkaz Sadot ("Sadot Center") and later Yad On ("Hand of Strength"). In 1979 it was renamed in honour of Avshalom Feinberg, a leader of the Nili espionage network who had died in Sinai during World War I. Avshalom was dismantled three years later as a result of the Camp David Accords. In 1990 a new community settlement by the same name was founded in Israel.

References

Populated places established in 1972
Former Israeli settlements in Sinai
1972 establishments in the Israeli Military Governorate
1982 disestablishments in the Israeli Military Governorate